Stefan Kulovits (born 19 April 1983) is an Austrian professional football coach and a former midfielder. He is the manager of Rapid Wien II.

Club career

Rapid Wien
Kulovits came through the youth ranks of Rapid Wien and made it to the senior team in the 2002–03 season after a year at the reserves team. He won two league titles with Rapid and played in the 2005–06 UEFA Champions League with them.

SV Sandhausen
Kulovits signed for 2. Bundesliga club SV Sandhausen in June 2013 and in his first season was appointed captain of the team. He made over 120 competitive appearances for the club and announced his retirement as a footballer at the conclusion of the 2019–20 season,

Coaching career

SV Sandhausen
He was named interim manager on 15 February 2021. He was sacked on 22 September 2021.

Rapid Wien II
On 3 January 2022, Kulovits was hired as the head coach of Rapid Wien II in the 2. Liga.

International career
Kulovits made his debut for the Austria national team in a February 2005 friendly match against Cyprus.

Honours
Rapid Wien
 Austrian Football Bundesliga: 2004–05, 2007–08

References

External links

1983 births
Living people
Footballers from Vienna
Association football midfielders
Austrian footballers
Austria international footballers
Austria youth international footballers
Austria under-21 international footballers
SK Rapid Wien players
SV Sandhausen players
Austrian Football Bundesliga players
2. Bundesliga players
Austrian football managers
SV Sandhausen managers
2. Bundesliga managers
Austrian expatriate footballers
Austrian expatriate sportspeople in Germany
Expatriate footballers in Germany
Austrian expatriate football managers
Expatriate football managers in Germany